Seasonal Shift is the eleventh studio album by the American band Calexico. It was released on December 4, 2020 via Anti-.

Track listing

Charts

References

2020 albums
Calexico (band) albums
Anti- (record label) albums